The 2019 Première ligue de soccer du Québec féminine season was the second season of play for the Première ligue de soccer du Québec, a Division 3 women's soccer league in the Canadian soccer pyramid and the highest level of soccer based in the Canadian province of Québec.

Dynamo de Quebec was the defending champion for the women's division. CS Fabrose won their first title this season.

Changes from 2018 
The women's division moved up to six teams. Lakers du Lac Saint-Louis did not return for 2019 and transferred their team to CS Mont-Royal Outremont, and CS Fabrose launched a team.

Teams
Six teams participated in the 2021 season. Each team played against every other team once. At the end of the season, the top four teams will qualify for the first edition of the League Cup (Coupe PLSQ).

Standings

Top scorers

Awards

References

PLSQF
2019